Balakrishna Shivram Moonje (B.S.Moonje, also B.S. Munje, 12 December 1872 – 3 March 1948) was a leader of the Hindu Mahasabha in India.

Career 

Moonje was born into a Deshastha Rigvedi Brahmin (DRB) family in 1872 at Bilaspur in Central Provinces. He completed his Medical Degree from Grant Medical College in Mumbai in 1898, and was employed in Bombay Municipal Corporation as a Medical Officer. He left his job to participate in the Boer War in South Africa through the medical wing, as the King's Commissioned Officer.

Following the death of Bal Gangadhar Tilak in 1920, Moonje dissociated from Congress. He disagreed with the two main policies of M. K. Gandhi, namely his non-violence and secularism. His association with Hindu Mahasabha increased and he was also political mentor of Hedgewar who founded RSS in 1925. 

Moonje was the All India President of the Hindu Mahasabha from 1927 until he handed over the charge to Vinayak Damodar Savarkar in 1937. Until his death, he was active in the Mahasabha and toured all over India. Savarkar had his strong support. He also attended the Round Table Conferences (in London) twice, despite strong opposition from Congress leaders on his views.

Trip to Italy
In 1931, Moonje travelled to Italy, where he met with Prime Minister Benito Mussolini and was shown the militarization of society through a guided tour of organizations such as Balilla, the Accademia della Farnesina and other military schools and educational institutions. He visited the Italian Fascist youth organization the Opera Nazionale Balilla, which he praised.

Moonje was deeply influenced by these fascist organizations, in which he saw an opportunity to militarize Hindu society in order to fight against both internal and external threats. After returning from his Italy visit, he set up Bhonsala Military School in Nasik. The Rashtriya Swayamsevak Sangh (RSS) later appropriated this model on a larger scale, and there is an uncanny similarity between the RSS and Balilla in terms of recruitment and organizational setup.

Moonje remained in constant contact with the fascist supporter Giuseppe Tucci through letters. Moonje died on 3 March 1948, aged 75.

References

Bibliography 

 
 
 

1872 births
1948 deaths
20th-century Indian politicians
University of Mumbai alumni
Marathi politicians
Members of the Central Legislative Assembly of India
Hindu Mahasabha politicians
Indian National Congress politicians from Chhattisgarh
People from Bilaspur district, Chhattisgarh